Barrie North Collegiate Institute is a public secondary school (grades 9–12) located in Barrie, Ontario, Canada. It was established in 1957 as part of the Simcoe County District School Board in southern Ontario. The principal is Greg Brucker.

Barrie North CI has a  catchment area of north Barrie, and a large rural portion of Springwater Township (villages of Midhurst & Minesing).

Clubs
The school offers many extracurricular activities such as sports teams, concert band and choir, jazz ensembles, and numerous clubs such as Free the Children and Canoe club.

Barrie North's improvisational team won Gold in 2009/2010 for the Canadian Improv Games (Toronto Region). The team placed 9th in Canada at the Canadian Improv Game National Championship beating out 600 teams cross-country.

Gifted Program

Barrie North offers a gifted program open to all students. Gifted courses may move at a quicker pace than standard courses and cover material in more depth. Some gifted courses include Math, Science, English, Art, Geography, Latin, and Civics and Careers. Gifted courses are available in grades 9 and 10, and AP (advanced placement) courses which are an extension of the gifted program are available in grade 12. Certain pre-AP courses are also available in grade 11.

French Immersion Program
Barrie North offers a french immersion program that offers many French courses, as well as the opportunity to receive a French Immersion Certificate as long as the requirements have been met. This program was instated in September, 2021

Feeder schools
Codrington PS
Cundles Heights PS
Emma King ES
Forest Hill PS
Hillcrest PS
Maple Grove PS
Minesing Central PS
Oakley Park PS
West Bayfield ES
Andrew Hunter PS

References

External links
Barrie North Collegiate Institute
Profile at the Education Quality and Accountability Office (EQAO) web site

High schools in Barrie
1957 establishments in Ontario
Educational institutions established in 1957